"The Long and Winding Road" is a song by the English rock band the Beatles from their 1970 album Let It Be. It was written by Paul McCartney and credited to Lennon–McCartney. When issued as a single in May 1970, a month after the Beatles' break-up, it became the group's 20th and last number-one hit on the Billboard Hot 100 chart in the United States.

The main recording of the song took place in January 1969 and featured a sparse musical arrangement. When preparing the tapes from these sessions for release in April 1970, producer Phil Spector added orchestral and choral overdubs. Spector's modifications angered McCartney to the point that when he made his case in the English High Court for the Beatles' disbandment, McCartney cited the treatment of the song as one of six reasons justifying the split. New versions of the song with simpler instrumentation were subsequently released by McCartney and by the Beatles.

Inspiration

Paul McCartney said he came up with the title "The Long and Winding Road" during one of his first visits to his property High Park Farm, near Campbeltown in Scotland, which he purchased in June 1966. The phrase was inspired by the sight of a road "stretching up into the hills" in the remote Highlands surroundings of lochs and distant mountains. He wrote the song at his farm in 1968, inspired by the growing tension among the Beatles. Based on other comments McCartney has made, author Howard Sounes writes, the lyrics can be seen as McCartney expressing his anguish at the direction of his personal life, as well as a nostalgic look back at the Beatles' history. McCartney recalled: "I just sat down at my piano in Scotland, started playing and came up with that song, imagining it was going to be done by someone like Ray Charles. I have always found inspiration in the calm beauty of Scotland and again it proved the place where I found inspiration."

Once back in London, McCartney recorded a demo version of "The Long and Winding Road" during one of the recording sessions for The Beatles. Later, he offered the song to Tom Jones on the condition that the singer release it as his next single. In Jones' recollection, he was forced to turn it down since his record company were about to issue "Without Love" as a single.

The composition takes the form of a piano-based ballad, with conventional chord changes. McCartney described the chords as "slightly jazzy" and in keeping with Charles' style. The song's home key is E-flat major but it also uses the relative C minor. The opening theme is repeated throughout. The song lacks a traditional chorus, and the melody and lyrics are ambiguous about the opening stanza's position in the piece. In this way, according to musicologist Alan Pollack, it is unclear whether the song has just begun, is in the verse, or is in the bridge.

In an interview in 1994, McCartney said of "The Long and Winding Road": "It's rather a sad song. I like writing sad songs, it's a good bag to get into because you can actually acknowledge some deeper feelings of your own and put them in it. It's a good vehicle, it saves having to go to a psychiatrist." He also told his biographer Barry Miles in the 1990s that the song was "all about the unattainable; the door you never quite reach ... the road that you never get to the end of".

Recording

January 1969
McCartney premiered "The Long and Winding Road" on 7 January 1969 during the Beatles' filmed rehearsals at Twickenham Film Studios. After they abandoned thoughts of returning to public performance, and instead decided to make a new album, the band recorded several takes of the song at their Apple Studio in central London on 26 January and again on 31 January. The line-up was McCartney on lead vocals and piano, John Lennon on six-string bass guitar, George Harrison on electric guitar played with a Leslie speaker effect, Ringo Starr on drums, and guest keyboardist Billy Preston on electric piano. Lennon, who rarely played bass, made several mistakes on the recording.

As seen in the Get Back documentary, following the 26 January recording session, the band discussed the possibility of adding an orchestral accompaniment to the song. "The only way I've ever heard it in my head," McCartney said, "is like Ray Charles's band.... We were planning to do it anyway for a couple of numbers, just to have a bit of brass and a bit of strings." George Harrison supported the idea of a brass accompaniment: "It would be nice with some brass just doing the sustaining chord thing, moving and just holding notes."

In May 1969, Glyn Johns, who had been asked by the Beatles to compile and mix the Get Back album from the sessions, selected the 26 January recording. The 31 January take, which had slightly different lyrics and was recorded with Johns in an unofficial producer's role, was used in the film, subsequently titled Let It Be.

April 1970
In early 1970, Lennon and Harrison asked the Beatles' manager, Allen Klein, to turn over the January 1969 recordings to American producer Phil Spector, in the hope of salvaging an album to accompany the Let It Be documentary film. McCartney had become estranged from his bandmates at this time, due to his opposition to Klein's appointment as manager. Several weeks were lost before McCartney replied to messages requesting his approval for Spector to begin working on the recordings. Spector chose to return to the same 26 January recording of "The Long and Winding Road".

Spector made various changes to the songs. His most dramatic embellishments occurred on 1 April 1970, the last ever Beatles recording session, when he added orchestral overdubs to "The Long and Winding Road", "Across the Universe" and "I Me Mine" at EMI Studios. The only member of the Beatles present was Starr, who played drums with the session musicians to create Spector's characteristic Wall of Sound. Already known for his eccentric behaviour in the studio, Spector was in a peculiar mood that day, according to balance engineer Peter Bown: "He wanted tape echo on everything, he had to take a different pill every half-hour and had his bodyguard with him constantly. He was on the point of throwing a wobbly, saying 'I want to hear this, I want to hear that. I must have this, I must have that.'" The orchestra became so annoyed by Spector's behaviour that the musicians refused to play any further; at one point, Bown left for home, forcing Spector to telephone him and persuade him to return after Starr had told Spector to calm down.

Spector nonetheless succeeded in overdubbing "The Long and Winding Road", using eight violins, four violas, four cellos, three trumpets, three trombones, two guitars, and a choir of fourteen women. The orchestra was scored and conducted by Richard Hewson, a young London arranger who had worked with Apple artists Mary Hopkin and James Taylor. This lush orchestral treatment was in direct contrast to the Beatles' stated intentions for a "real" recording when they began work on Get Back.

On 2 April, Spector sent each of the Beatles an acetate of the completed album with a note saying: "If there is anything you'd like done to the album, let me know and I'll be glad to help ... If you wish, please call me about anything regarding the album tonight." All four of the band members sent him their approval by telegram.

Dispute over Spector's overdubs
According to author Peter Doggett, McCartney had felt the need to accommodate his bandmates when accepting Spector's version of Let It Be. However, following his announcement of the Beatles' break-up in a press release accompanying the release of his debut solo album, McCartney, on 9 April, he came to resent Spector's additions, particularly on "The Long and Winding Road." On 14 April, with manufacturing underway for Let It Be, he sent a terse letter to Klein, demanding that the harp be removed from the song and that the other added instrumentation and voices be reduced. McCartney concluded the letter with the words: "Don't ever do it again." Klein attempted to phone McCartney but he had changed his number without informing Apple; Klein then sent a telegram asking McCartney to contact him or Spector about his concerns. According to Klein, "The following day, a message was relayed to me [from McCartney] that the letter spoke for itself." With Let It Be scheduled for release in advance of the film, Klein allowed the production process to continue with Spector's version of "The Long and Winding Road" intact.

In an interview published by the Evening Standard in two parts on 21 and 22 April 1970, McCartney said:
The album was finished a year ago, but a few months ago American record producer Phil Spector was called in by John Lennon to tidy up some of the tracks. But a few weeks ago, I was sent a re-mixed version of my song "The Long and Winding Road" with harps, horns, an orchestra and women's choir added. No one had asked me what I thought. I couldn't believe it. I would never have female voices on a Beatles record.
The band's usual producer, George Martin, called the remixes "so uncharacteristic" of the Beatles. Johns, who was denied a production credit by Lennon, later described Spector's embellishments as "revolting ... just puke".

McCartney asked Klein to dissolve the Beatles' partnership, but was refused. Exasperated, he took the case to the High Court in London in early 1971, naming Klein and the other Beatles as defendants. Among the six reasons McCartney gave for dissolving the Beatles was that Klein's company, ABKCO, had imposed changes to "The Long and Winding Road" without consulting McCartney. In his written affidavit, Starr countered this statement by saying that when Spector had sent acetates of Let It Be to each of the Beatles for their approval, with a request also for feedback: "We all said yes. Even at the beginning Paul said yes. I spoke to him on the phone, and said, 'Did you like it?' and he said, 'Yeah, it's OK.' He didn't put it down." Starr added: "And then suddenly he didn't want it to go out. Two weeks after that, he wanted to cancel it." Author Nicholas Schaffner commented that, in light of McCartney's contention in the High Court, it was surprising that he personally accepted the band's Grammy Award for Let It Be in March 1971 – when the album won in the category Best Original Score Written for a Motion Picture or Television Special – and that he chose to feature his wife Linda's voice so prominently on his post-Beatles recordings.

Speaking to music journalist Richard Williams soon after the overdubbing sessions, Spector said that he had asked whether any of the Beatles would like to help him produce the album, but none of them had wanted to. He later said he was forced into orchestrating "The Long and Winding Road" to cover the poor quality of Lennon's bass playing; Spector also denied that McCartney was not consulted, saying that he had first contacted McCartney about the choice of musical arranger. In his book Revolution in the Head, Beatles scholar Ian MacDonald wrote: "The song was designed as a standard to be taken up by mainstream balladeers … It features some atrocious bass-playing by Lennon, prodding clumsily around as if uncertain of the harmonies and making many comical mistakes. Lennon's crude bass playing on 'The Long and Winding Road', though largely accidental, amounts to sabotage when presented as finished work." In 2003, Spector called McCartney's criticism "hypocritical", alleging that "Paul had no problem picking up the Academy Award  for the Let It Be movie soundtrack, nor did he have any problem in using my arrangement of the string and horn and choir parts when he performed it during 25 years of touring on his own. If Paul wants to get into a pissing contest about it, he's got me mixed up with someone who gives a shit."

Release
The song was released on the Let It Be album on 8 May 1970. On 11 May, seven days before the album's North American release, Apple issued "The Long and Winding Road" as a single in the United States with "For You Blue" on the B-side. The single was released in several European countries but not the United Kingdom. In the context of the recent news regarding the Beatles' split, the song captured the sadness that many listeners felt.

In the US, "For You Blue" gained sufficient radio airplay for Billboard to chart the two songs together, as a double-sided hit. The record was similarly listed as a double A-side when it topped Canada's singles chart. On 13 June 1970, it became the Beatles' twentieth and final number-one single on the Billboard Hot 100 chart and held the top position for a second week. The band thereby set the all-time record for number of chart-topping singles on the Billboard Hot 100. The Beatles achieved this feat in a period of less than six-and-a-half years, starting with "I Want to Hold Your Hand" on 1 February 1964, during which they topped the Hot 100 in one out of every six weeks. "The Long and Winding Road" also topped the US charts compiled by Cash Box and Record World, giving the band their 22nd and 23rd number-one hits on those charts.

The single had a relatively brief run on the Billboard Hot 100 and its contemporary US sales were insufficient for gold accreditation by the Recording Industry Association of America (RIAA). In February 1999, "The Long and Winding Road" was certified platinum by the RIAA for sales of 1,000,000.

Critical reception
Let It Be received largely unfavourable reviews from music critics, many of whom ridiculed Spector's use of orchestration, particularly on "The Long and Winding Road". In his album review for Melody Maker, Richard Williams wrote that "Paul's songs seem to be getting looser and less concise, and Spector's orchestrations add to the Bacharach atmosphere. The strings add a pleasant fullness in places, but intrude badly near the end and the harps are too much." Rolling Stones reviewer, John Mendelsohn, was especially critical of Spector's work, saying: "He's rendered 'The Long and Winding Road' ... virtually unlistenable with hideously cloying strings and a ridiculous choir that serve only to accentuate the listlessness of Paul's vocal and the song's potential for further mutilation at the hands of the countless schlock-mongers who will undoubtedly trip all over one another in their haste to cover it." Mendelsohn said that while the song was a "slightly lesser chapter in the ongoing story of McCartney as facile romanticist", "it might have eventually begun to grow on one as unassumingly charming" without Spector's "oppressive mush".

In 1973, musicologist and critic Wilfrid Mellers wrote: "The music has a tremendous expectancy … Whether or no Paul approved of the plush scoring of 'The Long and Winding Road', it works not because it guys the feeling but because the feeling has integrity." MacDonald said: "With its heart-breaking suspensions and yearning backward glances from the sad wisdom of the major key to the lost loves and illusions of the minor, 'The Long and Winding Road' is one of the most beautiful things McCartney ever wrote. Its words, too, are among his most poignant, particularly the reproachful lines of the brief four-bar middle section. A shame Lennon didn't listen more generously."

According to Williams, writing in his book Phil Spector: Out of His Head, Spector's mistake was in "taking McCartney at his face value" and emphasising the sentimental qualities that George Martin's orchestral arrangements for the Beatles had successfully tempered. Williams added: "Some might say that this track, above all others, epitomises Paul McCartney, and that when Spector sent the saccharine strings sweeping in after the first line of vocal, he was merely highlighting the reality." In a 2003 review for Mojo, shortly after the announcement that McCartney planned to issue "a string-less Let It Be", John Harris opined: "As someone who experiences a Proustian rush every time the orchestra crash-lands in 'The Long and Winding Road', I can only implore him to think again. Besides, underneath all the Wagnerian gloop, John's bass playing is horribly out of tune ..." Referring to the version subsequently released without the controversial overdubs, Adam Sweeting of The Guardian said the song was "indubitably improved by the removal of Spector's wall of schmaltz" but "still teeth-clenchingly mawkish".

In 2011, Rolling Stone placed "The Long and Winding Road" at number 90 on its list of "The 100 Greatest Beatles Songs". On a similar list compiled by Mojo in 2006, the song appeared at number 27. In his commentary for the magazine, Brian Wilson described it as his "all time favourite Beatles track", saying that while the Beatles were "genius songwriters", this song was distinguished by a "heart-and-soul melody". Wilson concluded: "When they broke up I was heartbroken. I think they should have kept going."

Other Beatles and McCartney versions
Since the original release in 1970, there have been six additional recordings released by McCartney. After he had resisted playing any of his Beatles songs with his band Wings, he included "The Long and Winding Road" in the set list for Wings' 1975–76 world tour. A live version appeared on the 1976 album Wings over America.

McCartney re-recorded "The Long and Winding Road" for the soundtrack to his 1984 film Give My Regards to Broad Street. George Martin produced the track, which includes saxophone accompaniment and what authors Chip Madinger and Mark Easter describe as a Las Vegas-style musical arrangement. A second new studio recording of the song was made by McCartney in 1989 and used as a B-side of single releases from his Flowers in the Dirt album, starting with the "Postcard Pack" vinyl format of "This One".

On McCartney's 1989–90 world tour in support of Flowers in the Dirt – his first world tour since 1975–76 – the song was performed with a musical backing that, in Kenneth Womack's view, "clearly attempts to replicate" the strings added by Spector in 1970. The version released on the live album from the tour, Tripping the Live Fantastic, was the only song taken from McCartney's two April 1990 shows at the Maracana Stadium in Rio de Janeiro. The live single version was also included on The 7" Singles Box in 2022.

The 1996 Beatles' outtakes compilation Anthology 3 includes the original 26 January 1969 take, without Spector's overdubs. "The Long and Winding Road" provided the working title for Apple executive Neil Aspinall's early version of the documentary film that became the 1995 TV series The Beatles Anthology. The title was changed in the 1990s after Harrison objected to the project being named after McCartney's song.

In 2003, McCartney persuaded Starr and Ono (as Lennon's widow) to release Let It Be... Naked. McCartney said that his long-standing dissatisfaction with the released version of "The Long and Winding Road" was partly the impetus for the new version. The album included a take of the song from 31 January 1969. With no strings or other added instrumentation, it was closer to the Beatles' original intention than the 1970 version. This take is also the one seen in the film Let It Be and on the Beatles' 2015 video compilation 1. Starr said of the Let It Be... Naked version: "There's nothing wrong with Phil's strings [on the 1970 release], this is just a different attitude to listening. But it's been 30-odd years since I've heard it without all that and it just blew me away."

"The Long and Winding Road" has continued to be a staple of McCartney's post-Beatles concert repertoire. In July 2005, he performed the song to close the Live 8 concert in London. On his 2009 tours, McCartney played it as part of a nostalgia-filled set that included tributes to Linda, Lennon and Harrison. In the case of "The Long and Winding Road", the performance was accompanied by screen-projected photos taken by Linda of the family's Arizona ranch, including the horse trail she and McCartney rode shortly before her death.

Cover versions
"The Long and Winding Road" was one of several McCartney compositions from the Beatles era that became widely covered by easy listening artists and persuaded adults that the younger generation's musical tastes had merit. A version by British singer Ray Morgan reached number 32 on the UK Singles Chart in 1970. 

As McCartney had originally envisaged, Ray Charles recorded a cover version in 1971, released on Volcanic Action of My Soul. A "live" vocal of Ray, as described in the liner notes to "Ray Sings, Basie Swings", was later overdubbed with the Count Basie Orchestra and issued on that 2006 album.  Aretha Franklin released a recording of the song on her 1972 album Young, Gifted and Black, a version that Rolling Stone writer Rob Sheffield calls "the greatest of all Beatle covers". Cilla Black released a version on her 1973 Martin-produced album Day by Day with Cilla; McCartney described this recording as the definitive version of the song.

Other versions include a cover by Leo Sayer on the 1976 All This and World War II soundtrack, a 1978 recording by Peter Frampton for Robert Stigwood's film Sgt. Pepper's Lonely Hearts Club Band, a 1999 performance by George Michael at the Royal Albert Hall memorial concert for Linda McCartney, and a 2010 performance at the White House by Faith Hill when Barack Obama gave McCartney the Gershwin Prize. In 1985, a recording by Billy Ocean peaked at number 24 on Billboards Adult Contemporary chart. In 2002, British Pop Idol series one contestants Will Young and Gareth Gates recorded a version released as a double A-side with Gates' version of "Suspicious Minds"; the single topped the UK Singles Chart and the Scottish Singles Chart. The duet by itself also reached number 4 in Ireland.

Personnel
According to Walter Everett, except where noted:

The Beatles
Paul McCartney – vocal, piano
John Lennon – six-string bass
George Harrison – electric guitar
Ringo Starr – drums

Additional musicians
Billy Preston – electric piano
Uncredited orchestral musicians – 18 violins, 4 violas, 4 cellos, harp, 3 trumpets, 3 trombones, 2 guitars, 14 female voices
Richard Hewson – orchestral arrangement
John Barham – choral arrangement

Charts

Weekly charts

Year-end charts

Certifications

Notes

References

Sources

External links
 
 

1970 singles
1970s ballads
2002 singles
Songs written by Lennon–McCartney
The Beatles songs
Will Young songs
Gareth Gates songs
Cissy Houston songs
Andy Williams songs
Song recordings produced by Phil Spector
Songs published by Northern Songs
Billboard Hot 100 number-one singles
Cashbox number-one singles
RPM Top Singles number-one singles
Apple Records singles
Rock ballads
Songs about loneliness
Songs about roads
1970 songs
Number-one singles in Scotland
UK Singles Chart number-one singles
Pop ballads